Kansas's 25th Senate district is one of 40 districts in the Kansas Senate. It has been represented by Democrat Mary Ware since her 2019 appointment to succeed Lynn Rogers who resigned following his election as Lieutenant Governor.

Geography
District 25 is based entirely in western Wichita, straddling the Arkansas River in central Sedgwick County.

The district is located within Kansas's 4th congressional district, and overlaps with the 86th, 92nd, 95th, 97th, 103rd, and 105th districts of the Kansas House of Representatives. At 20.4 square miles, it is tied with the 8th district for smallest Senate district in the state.

Recent election results

2020

2016

2012

Federal and statewide results in District 25

References

25
Sedgwick County, Kansas